Grace Dieu Manor School was a private Catholic preparatory school at Grace-Dieu, near Thringstone in Leicestershire, England.
The school closed in July 2020 and the site placed on the market.

Sexual abuse scandal
Victims of sexual abuse by former staff at the school are suing the Rosminian order, the owners of the school.  The abuse was catalogued in the 2011 BBC documentary Abused: Breaking the Silence.
 The eleven men's claims span a period  from 1952 to 1973, but many others have yet to be looked into  and involve sadistic physical, sexual and emotional abuse including regular beating.

A former principal, Charles Foulds, has said that the incidents "have no relevance to the school of today" but also that "everyone here is very distressed that any child suffered in this place over half a century ago."

References

Defunct schools in Leicestershire
Defunct Catholic schools in the Diocese of Nottingham
Catholic Church sexual abuse scandals in the United Kingdom
Violence against men in the United Kingdom
Educational institutions established in 1933
1933 establishments in England
Educational institutions disestablished in 2020